A by-election for the seat of Canterbury in the New South Wales Legislative Assembly was held on 14 June 1895 because Varney Parkes was forced to resign because he was bankrupt, but was re-elected unopposed.

Dates

Results

Varney Parkes resigned due to bankruptcy.

See also
Electoral results for the district of Canterbury
List of New South Wales state by-elections

References

1895 elections in Australia
New South Wales state by-elections
1890s in New South Wales